White wizard or white mage may refer to:

 White Mage (Final Fantasy), a character class in the series
 White Wizard, a character in the episode "The Dragon's Secret" of Scooby-Doo! Mystery Incorporated
 White Wizard, a character in Kamen Rider Wizard
 White Mage, a character in 8-Bit Theater
 White wizard, a seal in the Dreamspell Mayan calendar interpretation and game
 White Wizard, a variation of the drinking game Wizard Staff
 Burling Hull (1889–1982), nicknamed The White Wizard, an American magician
 White Wizard Games, an American games company

See also

 White Wizzard, an American heavy metal band
 White Witch (disambiguation)
 Wizard (disambiguation)
 Wizard (fantasy)
 Mage (disambiguation)
 Gandalf the White, in J. R. R. Tolkien's novels